"Back to the Streets" is a song by American rapper Saweetie, released on October 23, 2020 as the second single from her upcoming debut album Pretty Bitch Music. The song features American singer Jhené Aiko, and was produced by Timbaland.

Composition
Tom Breihan of Stereogum called the song a "pleasant, laid-back singsong melodic rap track". The instrumental contains "smooth piano chords and bouncy percussion". Saweetie sing-raps about being partners with one man before moving on to the next. Saweetie mentions in Genius interview that she includes "I really pulled from my experiences my home girls' experiences, my cousins' experiences and I put them into one record". In the Genius interview she talks about how she wanted to approach the breakup song different by giving it an upbeat rhythm although the lyrics convey a much deeper meaning.

Chart performance
The song debuted at number 76 on the Billboard Hot 100. Shortly after the release of the song "Best Friend", the song re-entered the chart and peaked at number 58.

Music video
The music video was released on November 20, 2020. Directed by Daniel Russell, it finds Saweetie floating on clouds as she sings.

Charts

Weekly charts

Year-end charts

Certifications

References

2020 singles
2020 songs
Saweetie songs
Jhené Aiko songs
Songs written by Saweetie
Songs written by Jhené Aiko
Songs written by Timbaland
Song recordings produced by Timbaland
Warner Records singles
Songs written by Federico Vindver